Dębie  is a village in the administrative district of Gmina Chrząstowice, within Opole County, Opole Voivodeship, in southwestern Poland.

The village has a population of 540.

References

Villages in Opole County